Pellon railway station is a closed station that served the area of Pellon in Halifax, West Yorkshire, England.

History

It was one of two stations on the short lived Halifax High Level Railway, which was built to serve the west side of Halifax. The station opened on 5 September 1890. The line had been originally been proposed to go straight through to Huddersfield however the plan was abolished. The branch and its two stations closed to passengers on 1 January 1917 due to the introduction of Electric trams to Halifax. The branch closed to goods on 27 June 1960 along with the line around Holmfield.

Notes

References

External links
 Pellon station (shown closed) on navigable 1947 O. S. map

Disused railway stations in Calderdale
Former Halifax High Level Railway stations
Railway stations in Great Britain opened in 1890
Railway stations in Great Britain closed in 1917